was a Japanese politician. He represented the Kyoto at-large district in the House of Councillors of the Diet of Japan, serving two terms from 1977 until 1989 as a member of the Japanese Communist Party. Sato was born in Nagoya, Aichi Prefecture and graduated from the Department of Science at the University of Kyoto. He was employed as a high school teacher before entering politics. He died of pneumonia in Uji, Kyoto at the age of 80 on 23 October 2007.

References 

Members of the House of Councillors (Japan)
1927 births
2007 deaths
Deaths from pneumonia in Japan
Japanese Communist Party politicians